Paraclemensia monospina is a moth of the family Incurvariidae. It is found on Hokkaido island in Japan.

The wingspan is 11 mm for males and 11.5 mm for females. The forewings are dark brown with a bronzy lustre.

The larvae feed on Sorbus alnifolia. They create an irregular rectangular case.

References

Moths described in 1982
Incurvariidae
Moths of Japan